Twelfth Night is a 1986 Australian film based on the play directed by Neil Armfield and starring Gillian Jones, Ivar Kants, and Peter Cummins.

Cast
 Gillian Jones as Viola and Sebastian
 Ivar Kants as Orsino
 Jacquy Phillips as Countess Olivia  
 Peter Cummins as Malvolio
 Kerry Walker as Feste  
 Geoffrey Rush as Sir Andrew Aguecheek
 John Wood as Sir Toby Belch
 Tracy Harvey as Maria

Production
Neil Armfield had directed a stage production for the Lighthouse Company, the State Theatre of South Australia. Several of the cast from that production reprised their roles, including Jacquy Phillips, Peter Cummins, John Wood and Geoffrey Rush; Ivar Kants and Tracey Harvey were new additions. Shooting began at the Balmain Bijou Theatre on 5 August 1985.

References

External links

Twelfth Night at Oz Movies
 

1986 films
Australian romantic comedy-drama films
Films based on Twelfth Night
Films scored by Alan John
1980s English-language films
1980s Australian films